Cheam School is a mixed preparatory school located in Headley, in the civil parish of Ashford Hill with Headley in Hampshire. Originally a boys school, Cheam was founded in 1645 by George Aldrich.

History
The school started in Cheam, Surrey.

In the 19th century, the school was strictly for the sons of gentlemen only. One boy had to leave when his father was found to be a tradesman, with a shop in London selling cutlery.

In 1934 the school moved to its present site on the borders of Hampshire and Berkshire, previously a country house known as Beenham Court, when its part of Surrey was developing from a quiet village into a busy suburb.

Just before the move, Prince Philip, Duke of Edinburgh was a pupil there. His son, the future King Charles III, was later a pupil at the school.

Present day

There are four houses (known as divisions): Aldrich (yellow), Beck (green), Gilpin (red), and Tabor (blue). The school colours are red and blue.

Cheam educates both boys and girls between the ages of three and thirteen and takes day-pupils as well as boarders.

Headmasters
1645–1685: George Aldrich
1685–1701: Henry Day
1701–1711: Robert LLoyd
1711–1739: Daniel Sanxay
1739–1752 James Sanxay
1752–1777: William Gilpin
1777–1805: James Wilding
1805– ?: Joseph Wilson
1826–1846: Charles Mayo
1856–1890: Robert Tabor
1891–1920: Arthur Tabor
1921–1947: Harold Taylor
1947–1963: Peter Beck
1963–1971: Michael Stannard
1972–1985: Michael Wheeler
1985–1998: Christopher Evers
1998–2016: Mark Johnson
2021-2022: Tom Haigh
2022–present: William Phelps

Notable alumni 
In alphabetical order:

 Henry Addington, 1st Viscount Sidmouth, Prime Minister, 1801–1804
 Charles Bathurst, 1st Viscount Bledisloe
 Lord Berners, painter and composer
 Ivo Bligh, 8th Earl of Darnley, England's first Ashes winning captain
 Prince Charles, Duke of Cornwall, future King Charles III
 Hugh Childers, Chancellor of the Exchequer, 1882–1885
 Randolph Churchill, minister and father of Winston Churchill
 Robert S. de Ropp researcher and writer
 Digby Mackworth Dolben, poet
 Reginald Drax, admiral
 Henry Carey Druce, British army officer, SAS
 William Fletcher rower
 William Gilpin (priest), headmaster, 1752–1777
 Douglas Hogg, 1st Viscount Hailsham, Lord Chancellor
 Yeshwantrao Holkar II, the last Maharaja of Indore, 1926-1947
 Aubrey Hopwood, lyricist and novelist
 Ronald Hopwood, British naval officer and poet
 Arthur Kinnaird, 11th Lord Kinnaird, footballer and banker
 Mark Lemon (1809–1870), founding editor of Punch and The Field
 Leonora MacKinnon, fencer for team Canada in the 2012 London Olympics
 Clements Robert Markham, explorer and Royal Geographical Society president
 Jake Meyer, Seven Summits mountaineer
 John Michell, writer and esotericist
 Prince Philip of Greece and Denmark, future consort of Elizabeth II
 Sukhumbhand Paribatra, 15th Governor of Bangkok
 Edward Plunkett, 18th Baron Dunsany, writer
 Harry Prendergast, Victoria Cross recipient
 Charles Younger, Scottish cricketer

See also
List of the oldest schools in the United Kingdom

Notes

External links
Cheam School official website

Educational institutions established in the 1640s
Preparatory schools in Hampshire
1645 establishments in England